Miller is a train station in Gary, Indiana, serving the South Shore Line commuter rail system. It serves the community of Miller Beach and is one of three South Shore Line stations within the municipal boundaries of Gary. 

The Miller community, now more commonly known as Miller Beach, is physically separated from the city of Gary and from other municipalities in Northwest Indiana by parcels of the Indiana Dunes National Lakeshore.

History
The station shelter was constructed in 1998.

Renovation
On October 30, 2007, the executive director of the Northwestern Indiana Regional Planning Commission announced that the current plan calls for the Miller station to be closed at an undisclosed date. This plan was met with fierce opposition from Miller residents as well as commuters from other neighboring communities who use the station. Miller station commuters objected to being forced to use the new Gary central station. On August 12, 2008, Gateway Partners, the developers behind the new project, announced their intention to revamp their proposal in response to controversy.

Currently the station is slated to be substantially renovated as part of a larger project to double track the South Shore Line between Gary and Michigan City. The renovation will add an additional track to the station and replace the current low-level platform with two high-level platforms (one to the south of each track), making the station accessible to passengers with disabilities. The renovation will also add a new station building, improve the existing parking lot, and add a new parking lot to the west of the station. The renovation also will add a stub track to the east of the station, allowing short-turn trains between Chicago and Miller, replacing the current terminus of Gary Metro Center. This renovation is projected to be completed in mid-2024.

Bus connections  
GPTC
 Route 13: Oak and County Line

References

External links
 
 South Shore Line - Stations
 South Shore Railfan.net
 Gateway Partners' Official Website
Station from Lake Street from Google Maps Street View

South Shore Line stations in Indiana
Transportation in Gary, Indiana
Railway stations in Lake County, Indiana